Cudicini is an Italian surname. Notable people with the surname include:

Carlo Cudicini (born 1973), Italian footballer
Fabio Cudicini (born 1935), Italian footballer

Italian-language surnames